Harlem Youth Soccer Association is a Harlem-based, [non-profit] youth development organization using soccer as a means of doing social development.
The program serves youth in the Harlem/South Bronx community, focusing on boys and girls aged 5–12 and youth aged 13–19.
According to Irvine Smalls Jr., member of the board of directors, "“The real goal is to develop these kids holistically in a nontraditional sport.”

About the logo
The logo portraits as a shield featuring the lion's head which is widely understood as a symbol of strength, the lion also symbolizes other attributes such as courage, strength, honor, and leadership.

References

External links
FC Harlem

Organizations based in New York City
Soccer in New York City
Youth soccer in the United States
Soccer governing bodies in the United States
Harlem